Order of Saint Hubert can refer to:
 the Order of Saint Hubert, an dynastic order of the dukes of Jülich, electors of Palatine and kings of Bavaria
 the International Order of St. Hubertus, a hunting order of knighthood
 the Order of St Hubert in Württemberg, see Order of the Crown (Württemberg)